Angelo di Costanzo (1591), Italian historian and poet, was born at Naples around 1507.

Life
He lived in a literary circle, and fell in love with the beautiful Vittoria Colonna. His great work, Le Istorie del regno di Napoli dal 1250 fino al 1498, first appeared at Naples in 1572, and was the fruit of thirty or forty years labour; but nine more years were devoted to the task before it was issued in its final form at Aquila (1581).

It is one of the best known histories of Naples, and the style is distinguished by clearness, simplicity and elegance.

Notes

References

External links
 
 

1500s births
1591 deaths
Italian poets
Italian male poets
16th-century Italian historians
Writers from Naples
Italian male non-fiction writers
16th-century Neapolitan people